107.9 Muews Radio (107.9 FM) was a radio station owned and operated by Sagay Broadcasting Corporation. The station's studios and transmitter are located along Romulo Ave., Brgy. San Vicente, Tarlac City.

The station used to occupy 91.1 FM from December 2018 to June 2019, when its contract with the frequency's owner was terminated. Since then, it continued its operations until it went off the air a couple of months later.

References

Radio stations in Tarlac
Radio stations established in 2015